Geoffrey William Picard (March 20, 1943 – September 14, 2002) was an American rower who competed in the 1964 Summer Olympics. He was born in Oakland, California. In 1964 he was a crew member of the American boat which won the bronze medal in the coxless fours event.

He graduated from Harvard University and Harvard Business School.

References

External links

1943 births
2002 deaths
American male rowers
Rowers at the 1964 Summer Olympics
Olympic bronze medalists for the United States in rowing
Medalists at the 1964 Summer Olympics
Harvard University alumni
Harvard Business School alumni